Jess Stearn (April 26, 1914 – March 27, 2002) was an American journalist and author of more than thirty books, nine of which were bestsellers.

Early life
Stearn was born in Syracuse, New York to David Stearn, a rabbi. He graduated from Syracuse University.

Career
Stearn became a journalist for the New York Daily News and later an associate editor for Newsweek. He credited his journalistic training with helping him become a successful author.

Stearn specialized in books of sensationalist speculative non-fiction. His early work focused on outsiders and marginalized individuals such as prostitutes, drug addicts, and gay men (The Sixth Man). His later work focused on spirituality, the occult, and psychic phenomena. His most popular works were two biographies on the American psychic Edgar Cayce; Stearn was a conference speaker for the Association for Research and Enlightenment and a proponent of Cayce's theories.

Stearn might have been one of the forerunners of bringing Eastern thought into the Western world through his best-selling 1965 book, Yoga, Youth and Reincarnation.

Personal life
Stearn married twice and had two children, Martha and Fred. He had a longtime close friendship with actress and radio/television personality Arlene Francis. That may have had a connection to the first mention of his name in a nationally syndicated newspaper column. A reference to his latest book appeared in the Voice of Broadway column written by Francis' television colleague Dorothy Kilgallen.  Either Kilgallen or her editor at the New York Journal American placed a plug for Yoga, Youth and Reincarnation in that paper's September 15, 1965 edition immediately after an item about an upcoming Johnnie Ray concert in Las Vegas. Ten years later, Francis discussed one of her recurring dreams with Stearn for a book he was writing that included a section on dreams.  Stearn and Francis shared interests in yoga and weightlifting.

Death
Stearn died of congestive heart failure on March 27, 2002 in his Malibu, California home. He chose not to have a funeral because of his belief in reincarnation.

Bibliography

References

1914 births
2002 deaths
Writers from Syracuse, New York
People from Malibu, California
Syracuse University alumni
Jewish American writers
Writers from California
Journalists from New York (state)
Journalists from California
American social sciences writers
American spiritual writers
New Age writers
20th-century American biographers
20th-century American journalists
American male journalists
20th-century American Jews
21st-century American Jews